Amalie Riggelsen Wichmann (born 4 March 1995) is a Danish handball player who currently plays for Horsens HK.

References

1995 births
Living people
People from Vallensbæk Municipality
Danish female handball players
Sportspeople from the Capital Region of Denmark